Bibliotheca Sacra (colloquially referred to as "BibSac") is a theological journal published by Dallas Theological Seminary, first published in 1844 and the oldest theological journal in the United States. It was founded at Union Theological Seminary in 1843, and moved to Andover Theological Seminary (now Andover Newton Theological School) in 1844 after publishing three issues, to Oberlin College in 1884, and to Xenia Seminary in 1922. Dallas Theological Seminary (then the Evangelical Theological College) took over publication in 1934.

Editors 

The founding editor of Bibliotheca Sacra was Edward Robinson, who handed it over to Bela Bates Edwards in 1844, who merged it with the Biblical Repository in 1851. Upon his death in 1852, it was taken over by Edwards Amasa Park, who pledged to "cherish a catholic spirit among the conflicting schools of evangelical divines." He held the editorship until 1884, when he transferred control of the journal to George Frederick Wright at Oberlin College in an effort to keep it safe from growing liberal sentiment at Andover. Wright edited Bibliotheca Sacra until 1921, when he was succeeded by Melvin G. Kyle. Kyle's successors as editor were John H. Webster (1930–1933), Rollin T. Chafer (1934–1940), Lewis Sperry Chafer (1940–1952), John F. Walvoord (1952–1985), Roy B. Zuck (1986–2013), Larry J. Waters (2013–2018), and Glenn R. Kreider (2018–present).

References

External links, 1st series

  Volume 1, 1844
  Volume 2, 1845
 Volume 3. 1846
  Volume 4, 1847
 Volume 5. 1848
 Volume 6, 1849
 Volume 7 1850
  Volume 8, 1851
 Volume 9 1852
 Volume 10 1853
 Volume 11 1854
 Volume 12 1855
 Volume 13 1856
 volume 14 1857
 Volume 15 1858
  Volume 16, 1859
 Volume 17, 1860
 Volume 18, 1861
 Volume 19. 1862
 Volume 20, 1863

External links, 2nd series

 Volume 1, 1851 
 Volume 2
 Volume 3
 Volume 4 
 Volume 5 
 Volume 6 
 Volume 7 
 Volume 8
 Volume 9 
 Volume 10
 Volume 11
 Volume 12 
 Volume 13
 Volume 14
 Volume 15 
 Volume 16 
 Volume 17 
 Volume 18 
 Volume 19
 Volume 20 
 Volume 21 
 Volume 22 
 Volume 23 
 Volume 24 
 Volume 25 
 Volume 26 
 Volume 27 
 Volume 28 
 Volume 29 
 Volume 30 
 Volume 31 
 Volume 32
 Volume 33
 Volume 34
 Volume 35 
 Volume 36 
 Volume 37 
 Volume 38 
 Volume 39
 Volume 40 
 Volume 41
 Volume 42 
 Volume 43 
 Volume 44
 Volume 45 
 Volume 46 
 Volume 47
 Volume 48
 Volume 49
 Volume 50 
 Volume 51 
 Volume 52 
 Volume 53 
 Volume 54 
 Volume 55 
 Volume 56 
 Volume 57 
 Volume 58
 Volume 59 
 Volume 60 
 Volume 61 
 Volume 62
 Volume 63
 Volume 64 
 Volume 65
 Volume 66
 Volume 67
 Volume 68
 Volume 69
 Volume 70 
 Volume 71
 Volume 72 
 Volume 73 
 Volume 74
 Volume 75
 Volume 76 
 Volume 77
 Volume 78
 Volume 79, 1922
 Volume 80

Protestant studies journals
Publications established in 1844
Quarterly journals